Anchinia laureolella is a species of moth of the family Depressariidae. It is found in Spain, France, Switzerland, Austria, Italy, Slovenia, Hungary, Bulgaria, North Macedonia, Greece, Iran and Afghanistan.

The larvae feed on Daphne striata.

Subspecies
Anchinia laureolella laureolella
Anchinia laureolella iranica Lvovsky, 1997 (Iran)
Anchinia laureolella afghanica Lvovsky, 1997 (south-eastern Afghanistan)

References

External links
lepiforum.de

Moths described in 1854
Anchinia
Moths of Europe